Rob Ouwerkerk (born 18 April 1955, Amsterdam) is a former Dutch figure skater.

Results

References

External links
results

1955 births
Living people
Dutch male single skaters
Sportspeople from Amsterdam
20th-century Dutch people